Jimmy White is an American singer-songwriter and record producer.

Background
James Albert White was born in Paterson, New Jersey, the son of James Robert White and Lois Elaine Costa. At the age of nineteen, he sold his first song to MCA Music in New York.
During his career, he has released five studio albums, which have earned him four New Music Awards, seven Independent Music Awards and one NRadio award.   He has charted in the Billboard AC Top 40 six times and has charted FMQB AC Top 10 seven times. White began his career while attending Seton Hall University in South Orange, New Jersey, and has written, produced and performed continuously since that time.

Music
White is a self-taught pianist. He started composing music and lyrics in his early teenage years.  In 1993, he released his first album, "One Track Heart", which included "My My Maria", a song that had previously entered the Billboard Hot 100 in the mid 1980s. "One Track Heart" was later digitally released in 2006, and spawned White's first two No.1 singles, "Change My Life",
and "One Track Heart". In the spring of 2015, "Change My Life", was chosen for and included in the worldwide release of the French-Canadian film Aurelie Laflamme's Diary.

In 2007, "Hidden Pictures", White's second album, was released and spawned 2 No. 1 singles, "Sure Feels Like Love" and "Someone I Used To Know". White also won the "Crossover Artist of the Year" award at the New Music Awards, in Hollywood, California and performed to rave reviews at the show, held at the Avalon Theatre in Hollywood, CA.

White released his third CD in 2008 titled Sure Feels Like Love, a greatest hits compilation. He scored his fifth No. 1 single in 2008 with "MLG", which is White's only single never to be included on any of White's albums. Later that year White released a holiday single titled "I Wish You Peace."  He also produced and starred in his first music video, directed by Lark Watts. "I Wish You Peace" reached regular rotation on the Gospel Music Channel's Holiday Video Playlist, reaching over 45 million households on a daily basis. Both the single and video of "I Wish You Peace" have become a holiday staples, with regular airplay each year on Billboard (Mediabase) radio stations and a video distribution that now reaches over 80 million households annually, during the holiday season.
 
In 2009, White released a single entitled "So Far Behind", White's first single to crack the FMQB Top 10.  Again, in 2009 White again won the "Crossover Artist of the Year" Award at the New Music Awards, the first two-time winner in New Music Award history. He also won a second award for "Best Male Artist" at the IMN Independent Music Awards in Los Angeles, California.

In 2010, White released  "Just What I Need", a duet with the celebrated Country/Americana star, Jonell Mosser.  The single stayed at number one on the Independent Music Network AC and Country Charts, simultaneously, for a record 20 weeks in a row.  In 2010, White won two more awards. The first for "Best AC Group/Duo", with Mosser, for the single "Just What I Need" and "Best Male Artist" at the IMN Music Awards for the second consecutive year.
In January 2011 White released the single  "Katy Did" followed by a music video that has since garnered nearly 600,000 views. The single for "Katy Did" hit No. 1 on the national STS AC chart
and reached No. 8 on FMQB AC.

In early 2011 White released a single he wrote entitled "Forever and a Day". This single represented a production collaboration between White and producer Gary Mallaber, of the Steve Miller Band.  The video for "Forever and a Day" won Best Video at the Independent Music Awards. The video for "Forever And A Day" has since garnered over 580,000 views on YouTube alone. "Forever And A Day" reached No. 1 on the STS National AC chart and charted No. 7 on the FMQB AC chart, where it also was tied with Steven Tyler for the Most Added record in the country three weeks in a row.

In September 2011 White released his fourth CD, titled Two Cities. Hard Rock Cafe critic John Shelton Ivany reviewed Two Cities and called it a "remarkable work" and "one of the best albums of 2011". On October 3, 2011, White released the single "Hard Ride"’, which became White's first Top 40 No. 1 single.  Later in 2011, White released the video for his single "Good Friends Are Hard To Find", which has since garnered over three million views worldwide. "Good Friends Are Hard To Find" represents White's commitment to animal rights and was featured on the Bands For Bella compilation CD released by the Bella Moss Foundation in 2010. In 2011, White won his third consecutive IMN Music Award for "Best Male Artist", an unprecedented achievement for this show.  He also won a second IMN award for "Crossover Artist of the Year" and "Best Video" for "Forever and A Day". He currently holds the record for receiving the most nominations in a single award show, most awards in one show, and the most lifetime nominations for the IMN Independent Music Awards. He also holds the same records for the New Music Awards, both for single shows and lifetime, as noted above.

In 2013, White released his fifth CD titled My Mom Joined The Circus.  This CD contained eleven new tracks with two Rock Hall of Fame musicians, Gary Mallabar and members of Kenny Rogers's band.

In February 2016, White released his new single "Michaela".  The song reached #1 on New Music Weekly (STS), National Radio Hits and the Independent Music Network. "Michaela" became White's highest charting single on the national FMQB AC chart, reaching No. 5. FMQB is the largest radio reporting chart in the world. In May 2016, the video for the single "Michaela" was released. In June 2016, the first National Radio Hits Awards were held in Los Angeles, and White was awarded "Favorite AC 40 Male Artist" of the year, his sixth lifetime award for being Best Male Artist spanning three different award shows. White released his single "Miserable Man" in August 2016. It hit No.1 on the Christian/National Radio Hits charts, the NRH AC chart, and the IMN Independent AC chart and reached the Top 15 on FMQB AC. In January 2017, White won his fifth "Best Male Artist" award at the IMN Independent Music Awards in Los Angeles, and was nominated for "Male Artist Of The Year" and "Breakthrough Artist Of The Year" for the upcoming New Music Awards show to be held in Hollywood.

Discography

Studio albums

Singles

Music videos

References

1955 births
Living people
musicians from Paterson, New Jersey
People from Totowa, New Jersey
Seton Hall University alumni